The Chicago–Kansas City Expressway is a highway that runs between Chicago, Illinois, and Kansas City, Missouri. The road is known as Route 110 in Missouri and Illinois Route 110 (IL 110) in Illinois. IL 110 was created through legislation on May 27, 2010, as the designated route for the Illinois portion of the Chicago–Kansas City Expressway.

Route description

Missouri
The Expressway starts in downtown Claycomo on I-35 and leaves the city in a northeast direction. In Cameron, the route turns east on US 36 and crosses the state via Chillicothe and Macon.  East of Hannibal, the route continues east on I-72 through Hannibal and across the Mississippi River.

US 36 and I-35 in Missouri has the same comprehensive sign package similar to Illinois along the Chicago–Kansas City Expressway, including the Route 110 designation and the "CKC" logo on every route marker between Hannibal and Kansas City.

Illinois

IL 110 crosses into Illinois from the Mark Twain Memorial Bridge east of Hannibal. It follows Interstate 72 (I-72) east to I-172, then runs north with I-172 to IL 336 around the city of Quincy. Both routes run north to Carthage, where IL 110 and IL 336 join with US 136. All three routes run east to Macomb, where IL 110 then continues north with US 67 to Monmouth. There is a  stretch of the route in Good Hope, where it is reduced from a four-lane divided highway to a three-lane undivided street with a center turn lane.

At Monmouth, IL 110 joins US 34 and runs east to I-74. IL 110 then joins I-74 and runs north to near the Quad Cities, joining with I-80 before joining I-88 eastbound. The two highways continue east to I-88's eastern terminus in Hillside, where IL 110 continues on I-290, terminating at the Circle Interchange near the Chicago Loop.

History

Cannon Ball Route

The Cannon Ball Route was a historic auto trail that ran from Hannibal, Missouri east-northeast to Chicago, Illinois. The route was included in the 1917 Map of Marked Routes provided by the Illinois State Highway Department, a precursor to the modern-day Illinois Department of Transportation.

This highway routing closely parallels the Hannibal-Quincy to Chicago branch of the Chicago, Burlington & Quincy Railroad.
This route stayed west and north of the Illinois River, so this route never had to cross the limited number of Illinois River bridges in 1917.

Southern Illinois
IL 110 was the designation for what is present-day IL 15 from St. Libory, Illinois to just south of Addieville, where it meets up with IL 160.  During the World War II years, IL 15 was part of what is now IL 160, and the section from St. Libory to Addieville was IL 110.  The number was dropped in favor of US 460; the present IL 15 and IL 160 routings came in the mid-1960s.

Raven Road in Washington County is a stub of the former IL 15, and that intersection was the eastern terminus of IL 110.

Current route
Efforts to construct a direct route from Chicago to Kansas City have been in the planning stages since its exclusion from the Interstate Highway System in the 1950s. These efforts have been led by the Tri-State Development Summit, an economic development group for western Illinois, southeastern Iowa, and northern Missouri. The proposed highway took different forms over time: a 1989 study found that a full, limited-access tollway running from Kansas Turnpike at Kansas City to the Indiana Toll Road at Gary or Tri-State Tollway near the Joliet area would cost $2–$2.5 billion, if funded entirely by private investors.

In a joint resolution between the Illinois House and Senate in late May 2010, an expressway project connecting Chicago-to-Kansas City was named Illinois Route 110 (IL 110). The path,  in total, follows parts of the existing IL 336, I-88, I-172, I-72, I-74, US 136, US 67 and connect the cities of Quincy, Macomb, Galesburg, a number of communities of the Chicago metropolitan area, including Chicago itself on I-290.

In 2010, signs were posted with the "CKC" banner above the IL 110 sign. The Illinois Department of Transportation erected 470 IL 110 (CKC) signs at a cost of $94,000.

Junction list

See also
 Peoria-to-Chicago Highway
 Forgottonia

References

External links

 PDF of the entire route of the Chicago-Kansas City Expressway

110
State highways in Missouri
Transportation in Clay County, Missouri
Transportation in Clinton County, Missouri
Transportation in DeKalb County, Missouri
Transportation in Caldwell County, Missouri
Transportation in Livingston County, Missouri
Transportation in Linn County, Missouri
Transportation in Macon County, Missouri
Transportation in Shelby County, Missouri
Transportation in Marion County, Missouri
Transportation in Ralls County, Missouri
Transportation in Pike County, Illinois
Transportation in Adams County, Illinois
Transportation in Hancock County, Illinois
Transportation in McDonough County, Illinois
Transportation in Warren County, Illinois
Transportation in Knox County, Illinois
Transportation in Henry County, Illinois
Transportation in Rock Island County, Illinois
Transportation in Whiteside County, Illinois
Transportation in Lee County, Illinois
Transportation in Ogle County, Illinois
Transportation in DeKalb County, Illinois
Transportation in Kane County, Illinois
Transportation in DuPage County, Illinois
Transportation in Cook County, Illinois